This is a list of the best-selling singles in 1994 in Japan, as reported by Oricon.

References

1994 in Japanese music
1994
Oricon
Japanese music-related lists